Joe Kristosik (born c. 1974) is a former American football player.  After graduating from Bishop Gorman High School in Summerlin, Nevada, he entered the working world as a door-to-door salesman and a valet before enrolling at the University of Nevada, Las Vegas.  He was a walk-on to the UNLV Rebels football team and, after a redshirt season in 1994, he became the starting punter for the Rebels from 1995 to 1998. As a senior, he led the NCAA with an average of 46.2 yards on 76 punts.  His average of 46.2 yards per punt was, at the time, the second-highest in NCAA history for a punter with at least 75 career attempts.  Kristosik was a consensus first-team selection for the 1998 College Football All-America Team. He was inducted into the UNLV Athletic Hall of Fame in 2008.

References

Living people
All-American college football players
American football punters
UNLV Rebels football players
Players of American football from Nevada
Bishop Gorman High School alumni
Year of birth missing (living people)